Atromitos Football Club (PAE APS Atromitos Athinon), also simply known as Atromitos (literally meaning "Fearless"), is a Greek professional football club based in Peristeri, Athens, that plays in the Super League. It was founded in 1923 and its home ground is Peristeri Stadium.

In recent years, Atromitos has established itself as one of the most competitive and strong clubs in Greece. They were runners-up of the Greek Cup in 2011 and 2012 and have had breakthrough runs in the league, finishing 4th in 2011–12, 3rd in 2012–13, 4th in 2013–14 and 4th as well in 2014–15 and 2018–19. Their best performance in the league has been third place, which they have achieved in the 1928 and 2013 seasons of the Greek Championship.

History

Early years
Atromitos was officially founded on 31 May 1923 when Kalomvounis, Petos, Glykofridis, Stathopoulos, Synodinos, Rigopoulos, Stamatopoulos, and other students living in Victoria Square, (which was then called Kyriakou Square) decided to form a football team. That same year, Vaggelis Stamatis, a mathematics teacher and member of the Panhellenic football league, joined Atromitos' administration board – because of his prominence in pre-war Greek football history, Stamatis' involvement increased the new team's stature in Athenian football.

First league steps
In 1924, Atromitos was accepted into the Greek football league. At the time, Atromitos played at Aris Park, which was the home ground of Panellinios and Panathinaikos. During their first season in the league's first division, they ended in third place behind Panathinaikos and AEK. In 1928, they defeated Goudi 4–3 in the final game at Rouf Stadium to become champions of Athens. That same year, they took part in the first Panhellenic Championship as Athens champions, which was organised by the HFF. On 24 May 1928, they were beaten 3–1 by Aris Thessaloniki (who later became champions) in an away game, and were defeated again on 3 June by Ethnikos Piraeus (5–0). On 10 June, they managed a draw at home against Ethnikos (1–1), before losing again to Aris 3–1 seven days later. Overall in the national championship, Atromitos finished third.

During the following two years, Atromitos stayed in the upper part of the first division of Athens, and in 1929, they finished third behind Panathinaikos and AEK. They repeated the feat in 1930 but they were relegated from the first division of Athens in 1931, as they came last with only one point.

Move to Peristeri
In 1932, Ioseph Chourouktsoglou and Nikolaos Epioglou decided to move Atromitos to Peristeri. Earlier, it was located in the same area as Panathinaikos, and they had found it hard to establish a large fan base or develop a unique identity. There, they formed a merger with the local team of Astir Peristeriou (meaning "Star"), from which comes the crest of Atromitos, a blue star.

Before occupation of Greece, they played again in Panhellenic championship in the season of 1938–39.

Atromitos played in the second division until May 1972 when, under the coaching of Savvas Papazoglou, they were re-promoted to the first level. It proved a change too hard to handle, and they were demoted the following year. In 1975, a better-prepared Atromitos returned to the first division with a large fanbase, and ended the year in 13th place, securing their spot in the top flight. In 1976, they improved to end the season in 9th place, the best in the club's history. But, they were relegated in 1977.

By 1981, Atromitos had succeeded in attracting renowned players such as Stylianopoulos, Álvarez, Toskas and Athanasopoulos. However, despite high expectations, the club finished last in the top flight, and once more returned to the lower divisions. After years of playing in the third division, Atromitos won promotion back to the second division in May 2002 by beating Levadiakos at Patras Stadium. The team played again in the top flight between 2005 and 2008 by merging with Chalkidona and returned to the top flight after playing one season in the second division in 2008–09.

In the 2010–11 season, Atromitos made a historic run to the Greek Cup Final. However, they lost 3–0 to AEK.

Recent years

2012–13 season

Atromitos finished the 1st half of the season in 4th place, together with Asteras Tripolis and 14 points from the top, but 4 points from 6th place, that doesn't redirect to the playoffs. On 6 January 2013, at the debut of Nikos Anastopoulos in the coaching position and the Portuguese footballer Fabio, Atromitos beat Kerkyra 2–0, with two headers. From Sokratis Fytanidis at the 26th minute and from Stathis Tavlaridis at the 31st minute. In other words, the win was awarded to the team by the two centre backs. The team stayed in 4th with Asteras Tripolis, but now 6 points from the 6th place. One matchday later, they managed to get the 0–0 from PAOK at Toumba, retaining the 6 points difference from PAS Giannina. On Matchday 18, they beat Platanias 1–0, getting to be only 3 points from 2nd place. The goal was scored by Eduardo Brito.

2015–16 season

For the 2015–16 season, Atromitos has achieved an important qualification to the UEFA Europa League playoffs after recording two wins against AIK Stockholm, 3–1 in the first game in Sweden and 1–0 in the rematch at Peristeri Stadium. There they faced highly rated Fenerbahçe S.K. of Turkey. They lost 0–1 in the first match at Peristeri Stadium and 0–3 in the rematch in Turkey and were eliminated.

Damir Canadi's era

At 21 June 2017, Atromitos announced Damir Canadi as the new head coach of the club. At 23 October 2017, Atromitos won AEK 0–1 in an away game and then recognition began. Atromitos finished 4th at the 2017–18 season.

On 20 March 2017, announced that Canadi will manage the club also for the 2018–19 season.

Crest and colours

Crest evolution

Kit evolution
First

Alternative

Facilities

Stadium

The home ground of Atromitos was once well-maintained but has been recently neglected. In its early days, Peristeri had grown to become the fourth largest municipality in Greece. The first club home ground was the grounds of "Bravery", which was located beyond the last shanty town of Evangelistria.

In 1953, Atromitos moved to their present location, which contained only central stands for the spectators; the changing rooms consisted of a small room at the end of the stands. Much later, a larger stand was built with a capacity of 6,000 spectators. It was also used for non-football purposes, such as musical performances.

During the chairmanship of Victor Mitropoulos in EPAE, blue and white plastic seats were installed in the central stand. Before the Athens Olympics, Atromitos installed floodlights and renovated the running track so the ground could be used as a coaching facility during the Olympic Games. Under the football ground there are spaces and facilities for activities such as wrestling, chess and boxing.

Repairs to fragile parts of the stadium due to humidity and earthquake damage are expected to be carried out.

Training ground
Since summer of 2007, Atromitos possesses a modern Sports Complex, located in the center of Peristeri. During the summer of 2004, this same Sports Complex has been used as the Peristeri Olympic Boxing Hall and includes a 3,000 spectators main pitch, an auxiliary pitch as well as a 5-a-side pitch, such as the club's offices.

Plus, Atromitos possess installations situated on NATO Avenue, in the Aspropyrgos area. The Aspropyrgos training center includes a football pitch, dressing rooms, a fully equipped gym and a massage area. The Aspropyrgos football pitch is also being used by the Atromitos U-21 and U-17 youth teams.

Supporters
Atromitos are based in western Athens and their main supporters club is called "Fentagin". Founded in 1980, they have a space underneath the stands. They are dedicated to support the local football club and their anti-fascist and anti-racist ideas and actions. The younger element of the support are known as the "Little Atoms".

Players

Current squad

Out on loan

Honours and achievements

Honours

Leagues
Football League (Second Division)
 Winners (3): 1971–72, 1979–80, 2008–09
Gamma Ethniki (Third Division)
 Winners (1): 1988
Delta Ethniki (Fourth Division)
 Winners (1): 1998
Athens FCA Regional Championship
 Winners (2): 1928, 1962

Achievements

Leagues
Super League
 Third place (2): 1927–28, 2012–13

Cups
Greek Cup
 Runners-up (2): 2010–11, 2011–12

Seasons in the 21st century 

Best position in bold.

Key: 1R = First Round, 3R = Third Round, 4R = Fourth Round, 5R = Fifth Round, GS = Group Stage, QF = Quarter-finals, SF = Semi-finals, RU = Runner-up.

Personnel

Ownership and current board

Executives

Administration Department

Football Department

Coaching staff

Medical staff

Former managers

 Alekos Sofianidis (1999)
 Vladimir Petrović (1999–2000)
 Georgios Paraschos (1 Jul 2002 – 9 Jan 2007)
 Dragan Kokotović (11 Jan 2007 – 9 Jul 2007)
 Ángel Guillermo Hoyos (10 Jul 2007 – 26 Mar 2008)
 Paulo Campos (28 Mar 2008)
 Dragan Kokotović (30 Mar 2008 – 25 Apr 2009)
 Vasilis Vouzas (2009)
 Giorgos Donis (1 Jul 2009 – 30 May 2012)
 Dušan Bajević (2 Jun 2012 – 23 Dec 2012)
 Nikos Anastopoulos (30 Dec 2012 – 7 Apr 2013)
 Georgios Paraschos (8 Apr 2013 – 22 Sep 2014)
 Ricardo Sá Pinto (23 Sep 2014 – 5 Feb 2015)
 Nikos Nioplias (6 Feb 2015 – 12 Jun 2015)
 Michalis Grigoriou (14 Jun 2015 – 3 Nov 2015)
 Traianos Dellas (8 Nov 2015 – 19 Sept 2016)
 Georgios Korakakis (19 Sep 2016 – 6 Feb 2017)
 Ricardo Sá Pinto (6 Feb 2017 – 12 Jun 2017)
 Damir Canadi (21 Jun 2017 – 5 May 2019)
 Giannis Anastasiou (24 May 2019 – 16 Nov 2019)
 Georgios Korakakis (17 Nov 2019 – 5 Dec 2019)
 Savvas Pantelidis (5 Dece 2019 – 20 Jul 2020)
 Damir Canadi (29 Jul 2020 – 4 Feb 2021)
 Savvas Pantelidis (5 Feb 2021 – 30 Jun 2021)
 Ángel López (1 Jul 2021 – 25 Sept 2021)
 Georgios Paraschos (25 Sept 2021 – 19 Dec 2021)
 Georgios Korakakis (17 Nov 2021 – 26 Nov 2021)
 Panagiotis Goutsidis (26 Nov 2021 – 29 Nov 2021)
 Chris Coleman (7 Jan 2022 – Present)

European competitions record
Last update: 14 August 2019

Notes 
 1R: First round
 2Q: Second qualifying round
 3Q: Third qualifying round
 PO: Play-off round

Sponsorships
Great Shirt Sponsor: NetBet
Official Sport Clothing Manufacturer: Capelli
Gold Sponsor: Cosmote
Official Sponsor: Athens Medical Group

References

External links

Official websites
Official website 
Atromitos at Super League 
Atromitos at UEFA
News sites
 Atromitos on atromitistas.gr 
 Atromitos news from Nova Sports
Other
 Atromitos store official website

 
Football clubs in Attica
Football clubs in Athens
Association football clubs established in 1923
1923 establishments in Greece